Seegebiet Mansfelder Land is a municipality in the Mansfeld-Südharz district, Saxony-Anhalt, Germany. It was formed on 1 January 2010 by the merger of the former municipalities Amsdorf, Aseleben, Erdeborn, Hornburg, Lüttchendorf, Neehausen, Röblingen am See, Seeburg, Stedten and Wansleben am See. On 1 September 2010 Dederstedt was absorbed into the municipality. These 11 former municipalities are now Ortschaften or municipal divisions of Seegebiet Mansfelder Land.

References

 
Mansfeld-Südharz